Shangri-La is a musical with a book and lyrics by James Hilton, Jerome Lawrence, and Robert E. Lee and music by Harry Warren.

Based on Hilton's classic 1933 novel Lost Horizon, it focuses on Hugh Conway, a veteran member of the British diplomatic service, who stumbles across a utopian lamasery high in the Himalayas in Tibet after surviving a plane crash in the mountainous terrain. When the dying High Lama asks him to take charge after his death, Conway must decide between embracing the inner peace, love, and sense of purpose he has discovered in this mysterious world or attempt to return to civilization as he knows it.

The Broadway production, directed by Albert Marre and choreographed by Donald Saddler, opened on June 13, 1956 at the Winter Garden Theatre, where it ran for only twenty-one performances. The cast included Dennis King, Shirley Yamaguchi, Martyn Green, Jack Cassidy, Alice Ghostley, Carol Lawrence, Berry Kroeger, Harold Lang, and Robert Cohan.

Irene Sharaff was nominated for the Tony Award for Best Costume Design.

An audiotape of the show was recorded live during a performance, but an original cast album never was released. The show was mounted for a 1960 television production as part of the Hallmark Hall of Fame, with several new songs, starring Richard Basehart, Claude Rains, Gene Nelson, Helen Gallagher, and Ghostley reprising her Broadway role.

Songs       

Act I      
 Om Mani Padme Hum
 Lost Horizon
 The Man I Never Met
 Every Time You Danced with Me
 The World Outside
 I'm Just a Little Bit Confused
 The Beetle Race
 Somewhere

Act II      
 What Every Old Girl Should Know
 Second Time in Love
 Talkin' with Your Feet
 Walk Sweet
 Love Is What I Never Knew
 We've Decided to Stay
 Shangri-La

References

External links
 
 Review in Time Magazine

1956 musicals
Broadway musicals
Musicals based on novels